Air Marshal Sir Lawrence Darvall,  (24 November 1898 – 17 November 1968) was a senior Royal Air Force officer.

RAF career
After attending and later graduating from the Royal Military College, Sandhurst, Darvall was commissioned into the Green Howards on 16 August 1916 during the First World War. After transferring to the RAF as a flying officer in 1919, he became officer commanding, RAF Hawkinge in April 1939. He served in the Second World War as officer commanding, RAF Andover from October 1939, officer commanding, No. 2 Flying Instructors School at RAF Cranwell from September 1940 and as Director of Air Transport Policy and Operations from 1943. He went on to be Air Officer Commanding, No. 46 Group in September 1944 and Air Officer Commanding, No. 216 Group in June 1945.

After the war he became Air Officer Commanding, Air Headquarters Italy in June 1946, Air Officer Commanding, No. 3 Group in March 1947 and Air Officer Commanding, Headquarters, RAF Flying Training Command in January 1949. After that he became Air Officer Commanding, No. 23 Group in February 1950, Commandant of the Joint Services Staff College in 1951 and Commandant of the NATO Defense College in Paris in November 1953 before retiring in April 1956.

He was granted the right to retain his rank of air marshal on his retirement.

References

1898 births
1968 deaths
Green Howards officers
Royal Air Force air marshals
Knights Commander of the Order of the Bath
Recipients of the Military Cross
British Army personnel of World War I
Royal Air Force personnel of World War II
Military personnel from Middlesex
Graduates of the Royal Military College, Sandhurst